Ruben Garcia or Rubén García  may refer to:

Association footballers
 Rubén García (footballer, born 1980), Spanish former football defensive midfielder
 Rubén García (footballer, born 1981), Spanish football midfielder
 Rubén García (footballer, born 1986), Spanish football right-back
 Rubén García (footballer, born 1993), Spanish football winger
 Rubén García (footballer, born 1982), Mexican football goalkeeper
 Rubén García (footballer, born 1998), Spanish football right-back

Other people
 Ruben Garcia (racing driver) (born 1946), American race car driver
 Rubén García Jr. (racing driver) (born 1995), Mexican stock car racing driver
 Ruben Garcia Jr. (FBI agent) (born 1951), former executive assistant director of the FBI